The 1999 DFS Classic singles was the singles event of the seventeenth edition of the Aegon Classic, a WTA Tier III tournament held in Birmingham, England, United Kingdom and part of the European grass court season. Els Callens and Julie Halard-Decugis were the defending champions but did not return to defend their title.

Corina Morariu and Larisa Neiland won in the final 6–4, 6–4 against Alexandra Fusai and Inés Gorrochategui.

Seeds
The top four seeded teams received byes into the second round.

Draw

Finals

Top half

Bottom half

References
 1999 DFS Classic Draws
 ITF Tournament Page
 ITF doubles results page

DFS Classic - Doubles
Doubles